Sitaram Agrahari (born c.1957) is a Nepalese journalist, poet  and editor-in-chief of Gorkhapatra, Nepal's oldest daily newspaper. He received Rajarshi Janak Award in 2011 for his contribution in Hindi poetry and fiction.

Early life and education 
Sitaram Agrahari born in 1957 in Duhabi of Sunsari district in Nepal. he did his Bachlor of Arts (honours), M.A in Hindi,M.A in political science(village profile due) and received Diploma in development journalism from Indian Institute of Mass Communication, New Delhi, India.
He received journalism training from the Thomson Foundation, United Kingdom. Received Rajasthan Patrika Award(India),Rajarshi Janak literary Award(Nepal).          Worked as  UNESCO Media coordinator , Nepal . Executive Member of Transparency International, Nepal

Career 
He was thrice editor-in-chief of Gorkhapatra Daily, the oldest daily in Nepal, Twice Managing Editor of The Gorkhapatra daily, published by Gorkhapatra corporation .Also the General Manager of Gorkhapatra corporation.He is founder president of Sports Journalist Forum. Sitaram Agrahari formerly held the post of Editor-in-chief of Yuva Manch (monthly) and Manoram Apsara (monthly magazine).

Books 
 Kathadweep (1977) jointly: First story collection from Nepal in Hindi
 Jiye Swabhiman Bhi (Poetry collection, 1996)
 Tumhi Se Kahta Hu (Poetry Collection, 2011),Beej hoon Mai (2018)

References 

1957 births
Hindi-language writers
Hindi-language poets
Nepalese male poets
Newar-language writers
Nepalese male short story writers
Nepalese short story writers
Living people
People from Sunsari District
Hindi-language poets from Nepal